Gerhard Adolf Janensch (24 April 1860, Zamborst – 2 February 1933, Berlin) was a German sculptor and medailleur.

Life 
At the age of seventeen, he entered the Prussian Academy of Arts, where he studied under  Fritz Schaper, Albert Wolff and Paul Thumann. In 1880, he started his own studio in Vienna, but returned to work with Schaper in 1883. The following year, he joined the German Artists' Association and received a stipendium to study in Rome for his work "Bacchant mit Panthern". He finally became self-sufficient in 1886 and began teaching at the Academy, where he remained until 1924. In addition to sculpture, he taught workshops on carpentry, blacksmithing, locksmithing and pottery. In 1892, he succeeded Wolff as head of the modelling class and was named a full member of the Academy in 1897.

One of his most prominent patrons was the entrepreneur and telecommunications pioneer, Robert Stock. Other figures of industrial workers (foundrymen, glass-blowers, boilermakers etc.) were a featured display in the "Art and Technology" exhibition, held at the Museum Folkwang in 1928.

Other selected major works
 The Johannes Bugenhagen Monument in Wittenberg (Bust, 1894).
 The statue of Asmus Jacob Carstens in the Altes Museum, Berlin.
 A figure of Carl Friedrich Gauss on the Potsdam Bridge in Berlin (melted during World War II)
 The Heinrich Schüchtermann Monument in Dortmund
 Der Große Kurfürst in der Jugend ("The Great Elector in Youth"), a monument for Prince (later Elector) Friedrich Wilhelm (shown with his dog), in Küstrin.

References

Further reading 
 Gerhard Janensch. In: Hans Vollmer: Allgemeines Lexikon der bildenden Künstler des XX. Jahrhunderts. Vol.2. E. A. Seemann, Leipzig 1955, pg.528
 Exhibition catalog, "Ethos und Pathos – Die Berliner Bildhauerschule 1786–1914" – Skulpturengalerie – Staatliche Museen Preussischer Kulturbesitz, pgs. 41, 274, 333, 347 and 489; also , pgs.133–135.
 Klaus Türk: Mensch und Arbeit. 400 Jahre Geschichte der Arbeit in der bildenden Kunst (Men and Work: 400 years of Work in the Visual Arts). The Eckhart G. Grohman Collection at the Milwaukee School of Engineering. VMSOE Press, Milwaukee, Wisconsin 2003, pgs.153, 186.
 Exhibition catalog, "Kunst und Technik 1928", in the Folkwang Museum. W. Girardet Verlag, Essen 1928, pgs.99/100.
 Georg Holländer: Die technische Landschaft. Guide to an exhibition by the Niederrheinischen Industrie- und Handelskammer. City of Duisburg, 1995, pg.11.

External links 

 Arcadja Auctions: Smaller figures by Janensch
 Brief Biography @ Historismus.net 

1860 births
1933 deaths
Prussian Academy of Arts alumni
20th-century German sculptors
20th-century German male artists
German male sculptors
19th-century sculptors
People from the Province of Pomerania
People from Złotów County